The 2003 Nigerian Senate election in Abia State was held on April 12, 2003, to elect members of the Nigerian Senate to represent Abia State. Uche Chukwumerije representing Abia North, Chris Adighije representing Abia Central and Adolphus Wabara representing Abia South all won on the platform of the Peoples Democratic Party.

Overview

Summary

Results

Abia North 
The election was won by Uche Chukwumerije of the Peoples Democratic Party.

Abia Central 
The election was won by Chris Adighije of the Peoples Democratic Party.

Abia South 
The election was won by Adolphus Wabara of the Peoples Democratic Party.

References 

April 2003 events in Nigeria
Abia State Senate elections
Abia